The 1976 Philippine Open was a men's tennis tournament played an outdoor clay courts in Manila, Philippines. It was the fourth edition of the tournament and was held from 15 November through 21 November 1976. The tournament was part of the Grand Prix tennis circuit and categorized as Two Star. Sixth-seeded Brian Fairlie won the singles title and the $10,500 first prize money.

Finals

Singles
 Brian Fairlie defeated  Ray Ruffels 7–5, 6–7, 7–6
 It was Fairlie's 1st singles title of the year and the 2nd and last of his career.

Doubles
 Ross Case /  Geoff Masters defeated  Anand Amritraj /  Corrado Barazzutti 6–0, 6–1

References

External links
 ITF tournament edition details

Philippine Open
 Philippine Open
Philippine Open
Tennis in the Philippines